The target shrimpgoby (Cryptocentrus strigilliceps) is a species of goby native to the Indo-West-Pacific where it occurs near coasts on silty or sandy reefs at depths of from .  This species is symbiotic with alpheid shrimps.  It can reach a length of  TL.  This species can also be found in the aquarium trade.

References

target shrimpgoby
target shrimpgoby
Taxa named by David Starr Jordan